William Charles Henderson (14 December 1887 – 17 April 1956) was an Australian rules footballer who played with Richmond and Melbourne in the Victorian Football League (VFL).

Family
The son of Edgar John Dean Henderson (1860-1895), and Julia Theresa Henderson (1861-1947), née Burke, (later Mrs. James Williamson), William Charles Henderson was born at Port Melbourne, Victoria on 14 December 1887.

He married Naomi Mina "Omie" Coventry (1888-1953) in 1911.

Football

Richmond (VFL)

Melbourne (VFL)
Cleared from Richmond to Melbourne on 25 May 1910.

Brighton (VFA)
Cleared from Melbourne in April 1913, Henderson played for Brighton in the VFA for two seasons: 1913 (14 games), and 1914 (13 games).

Death
He died on 17 April 1956.

Notes

References
 Hogan P: The Tigers Of Old, Richmond FC, (Melbourne), 1996.

External links 
 
 
 Demonwiki profile
 William Henderson, at The VFA Project.

1887 births
1956 deaths
Australian rules footballers from Melbourne
Richmond Football Club players
Melbourne Football Club players
Brighton Football Club players
People from Port Melbourne